The Instituto Técnico Militar (lit. Technical Military Institute), originally designed as the Colegio de Belén, Havana, is located at 45th and 66th streets in Marianao, Havana, Cuba.

History

Her Majesty Isabella II, Queen of Spain, issued a royal charter in the year 1854 founding the Colegio de Belén (Belen School) in Havana, Cuba. Belen School began its educational work in the building formerly occupied by the convent and convalescent hospital of Our Lady of Belen.

Instituto
In 1961 the government of Fidel Castro (himself a graduate of Belen) confiscated all private and religious schools in Cuba. Castro expelled the Jesuits and declared the government of Cuba an atheist government. Castro's government nationalized businesses and banks, confiscating more than $1 billion in American-owned property. Thousands of those dubbed “enemies of the revolution” were executed or imprisoned, and the school curriculum was reshaped by communist doctrine. Free speech was not an option, and the Cuban socialist press was an extension of the government.

See also
 Colegio de Belén, Havana
 Belen Jesuit Preparatory School
 List of Jesuit sites

References

Buildings and structures in Havana
Education in Havana
Schools in Havana
Educational institutions established in 1961
Schools in Cuba
Neoclassical architecture in Cuba
1961 establishments in Cuba